Hippargarava is a village in Lohara Tahsil, Osmanabad district, within the Indian state of Maharashtra. It is located 8.4 km by road west-southwest of the village of Lohara Bk. and 31.6 km by road east of the town of Tuljapur. The nearest post office is in Lohara Bk.

Demographics
In the 2011 census, had a population of 6,031.

Notes

Villages in Osmanabad district